Yumlu is a Turkish surname. Notable people with the surname include:

 Mustafa Yumlu (born 1987), Turkish footballer
 Nilüfer Yumlu (born 1955), Turkish pop singer

See also
 Yumu (disambiguation)

Turkish-language surnames